Mira Hassan Hoteit (born 20 September 2000) is a Lebanese footballer who plays as a defender for English club London Seaward.

Club career
Hoteit joined Safa in 2019; she played 10 games in the 2019–20 season. She left the club to join London Seaward in the FA Women's National League Division One South East (fourth tier) ahead of the 2022–23 season.

Honours
Zouk Mosbeh
 Lebanese Women's FA Cup runner-up: 2018–19

Safa
 Lebanese Women's Football League: 2020–21

Lebanon
 WAFF Women's Championship third place: 2019

See also
 List of Lebanon women's international footballers

References

External links

 
 

2000 births
Living people
21st-century Lebanese women
People from Nabatieh
Lebanese women's footballers
Women's association football defenders
Zouk Mosbeh SC footballers
Safa WFC players
Lebanese Women's Football League players
FA Women's National League players
Lebanon women's youth international footballers
Lebanon women's international footballers
Lebanese expatriate women's footballers
Lebanese expatriate sportspeople in England
Expatriate women's footballers in England